Kiss Kiss was an American indie rock band formed by Joshua Benash (guitar, synth, vocals) and Jared Karns (drums), with their first album released in February 2007.  Although their music is primarily indie in style, it also includes an electric violin.

History 
The band first formed at the State University of New York at Purchase, where Joshua Benash and Jared Karns had previously played in other bands.  The band took their name from a series of short stories by Roald Dahl.

Their debut full-length album, Reality vs. The Optimist, was released on February 6, 2007, under the New Jersey-based Eyeball Records. However, it had been recorded and prepared for release many months earlier, and several music tracks had leaked onto the Internet by November 2006. A "tour edition" of the CD, limited to 1,000 copies, was sold at shows between the November leak of the album and the February release date.

A blog post on the band's Myspace page, on August 7, 2008, stated that the band's second full-length album, The Meek Shall Inherit What's Left, was almost complete and expected to be released in early 2009.  A special edition re-release of Reality vs. The Optimist was planned for late 2008, but information regarding its release has since been removed from the Eyeball Records website.

The album The Meek Shall Inherit What's Left was officially released on July 7, 2009.

On January 7, 2011, Josh Benash announced a side project called "Vuvuzela" with some of the members of Kiss Kiss.

Musical influences 
Kiss Kiss has a range of various musical influences, which include:
The Beach Boys, Eric Satie, Björk, Blonde Redhead, Godspeed You! Black Emperor, Stravinsky, Mogwai, Neutral Milk Hotel, Tiny Tim, Tripping Daisy, The Kingston Trio, early Motown, The Olivia Tremor Control, Ramona Cordova, Hollywood Bukkake, Circulatory System, Radiohead, Mr. Bungle, Nirvana, Muse, Murder by Death, Cursive, The Turtles, Queen, and At the Drive-In.

Former members 
Josh Benash – guitar, vocals, synthesizer
Mike Abiuso – guitar, synthesizer, vocals
Jared Karns – drums
Rebecca "Beckster" Schlappich – electric violin
James O'Keeffe – bass
Sam Oatts – bass
Benjamin Jon- bass
Bob Pycior – violin
Evan Crow – guitar, synthesizer
James Wolff – electric violin, guitar
Lacy Rostyak – electric violin, vocals
Jonathan Jetter – guitar
Pat Lamothe – bass
Patrick Southern – bass

Discography

Singles

Music videos

References
Reality Vs. The Optimist Review - Absolutepunk.net

External links 
 Eyeball Records page
 Official Myspace Page
 Purevolume Page

Indie rock musical groups from New York (state)